Irvine John McGibbon (October 11, 1914 — February 1, 1981) was a Canadian professional ice hockey right winger who played in one National Hockey League game for the Montreal Canadiens during the 1942–43 season, on January 2, 1943 against the Toronto Maple Leafs. The rest of his career, which lasted from 1937 to 1950, was mainly spent in senior hockey leagues.

Career statistics

Regular season and playoffs

See also
 List of players who played only one game in the NHL

External links
 

1914 births
1981 deaths
Canadian ice hockey right wingers
Ice hockey people from Nova Scotia
Montreal Canadiens players
People from Antigonish, Nova Scotia
Washington Lions players